Bawabiya is a village about  from Aleppo, Syria, and about  off the road to Damascus.

Populated places in Mount Simeon District